The School for Arrogance is a 1791 comedy play by the British writer Thomas Holcroft.

The original Covent Garden cast included William Thomas Lewis as Count Conolly Villars, John Henry Johnstone as MacDermot, Francis Aickin as Mr Dorimont, William Farren as Edmund, Richard Wilson as Sir Paul Peckham, Joseph Shepherd Munden as Sir Samuel Sheepy, James Thompson as Exempt, Charles Farley as Footmen, Mary Wells as Lucy and Isabella Mattocks as Lady Peckham.

References

Bibliography
 Nicoll, Allardyce. A History of English Drama 1660–1900: Volume III. Cambridge University Press, 2009.
 Hogan, C.B (ed.) The London Stage, 1660–1800: Volume V. Southern Illinois University Press, 1968.

1791 plays
Comedy plays
West End plays
Plays by Thomas Holcroft